Government College, Malappuram, is a general degree college located in Malappuram, Kerala. It was established in 1972. The college is affiliated with Calicut University. This college offers different courses in arts, commerce and science.

Accreditation
The college is  recognized by the University Grants Commission (UGC).

Student activism
In February 2019 Kerala police arrested two students for allegedly protesting against sangh parivar.
 
Human rights organisations and Activists had taken a strong stand against the arrest of the students. They released a joint statement signed by the group of activists, lawyers, journalists demanding immediate release of the Student Activists.

Notable alumni
 A. Vijayaraghavan, Ex.MP
 V. Sasikumar, Ex-MLA
 Rinshad Reera, Student Activist

See also

References

External links
 
University of Calicut
University Grants Commission
National Assessment and Accreditation Council

Universities and colleges in Malappuram district
Educational institutions established in 1972
1972 establishments in Kerala
Arts and Science colleges in Kerala
Colleges affiliated with the University of Calicut
Education in Malappuram